Michael Butterworth may refer to:

 Michael Butterworth (author) (born 1947), British author and publisher 
 Mike Butterworth (1924–1986), British comic book writer